Who Wants to Be Rich? is a Ghanaian game show based on the original British format of Who Wants to Be a Millionaire?. The show is hosted by Kafui Dey. The main goal of the game is to win ₵50,000 by answering 15 multiple-choice questions correctly. There are three lifelines - fifty fifty, phone-a-friend and ask the audience. There are only 8 contestants in Fastest Finger First round. Who Wants to Be Rich? is broadcast from October 2009 to 2012. It is shown on the Ghanaian TV station GTV. When a contestant gets the fifth question correct, he will leave with at least ₵300. When a contestant gets the tenth question correct, he will leave with at least ₵1,500.

The game's prizes 
The payout structure is as below.

References

External links 
Official website

Who Wants to Be a Millionaire?
2009 Ghanaian television series debuts
Ghanaian television series
2000s game shows
2010s game shows
2000s Ghanaian television series
2010s Ghanaian television series
Ghana Broadcasting Corporation original programming